Cannon Park is a suburb in the southwest of the City of Coventry, West Midlands, England. It can be accessed via the major roads Kenpas Highway (A45) or Kenilworth Road. The area has a sizable shopping centre of the same name (considered 'state-of-the-art' when it opened in 1977) which features food stores, shops and eateries. Tenants include a post office, Tesco, Wilko and Iceland.

The residential area of Cannon Park was developed between the late-1960s and mid-1980s and is considered to be one of the most prosperous districts of the city. The University of Warwick is located directly adjacent to Cannon Park. The suburb is served by Cannon Park Primary School located within it.

It is bounded by the suburbs of Canley to the north and west, Westwood Heath to the south, Cannon Hill to the northeast, and Gibbet Hill to the southeast.

The bus stop at the shopping centre is used as the stop and sometimes terminus for Megabus services to London, Leeds, Manchester and Portsmouth.

There are currently plans in place to demolish the current shopping centre, and replace it with a new one including a significantly larger Tesco Extra store, similar in size to the one at the Ricoh Arena, Coventry. It is currently unclear when such plans will be developed, as whilst receiving planning permission from the local authority, there has been significant opposition from local residents.

External links
Cannon Park Shopping

Suburbs of Coventry